Anand Mohan Zutshi Gulzar Dehlavi (7 July 1926 – 12 June 2020) was an Indian Urdu poet, scholar, and journalist. Born in old Delhi's Gali Kashmeerian.

He was honored by the vice president of India on his 91st birthday for his contribution to Urdu poetry. He devoted his life to the service of Urdu, for which he was honoured by various personalities. He edited the first Urdu science magazine, Science Ki Dunya, which was launched in 1975. Pandit Jawahar Lal Nehru recited his poetry 'Zarurat Hai Un Naujawano Ki' on 15 August 1947 in Red Fort. His book 'Kulliyat-E-Gulzar' was launched by former Vice President Hamid Ansari.

Personal life
Gulzar Dehlvi was born to Pandit Tribhuvan Nath (also known as Zar Dehlvi) a Professor and Brij Rani Zutshi. Gulzar Dehlvi attended the Ramjas School and BVJ Sanskrit School. He gained a Master of Arts degree from Hindu College. His father, Pandit Tribhuvan Nath ‘Zar’ Dehlavi, received the public title of ‘molvi sahib’ for his dedication as a teacher of Urdu and Persian languages at the Delhi University for around 40 years. He also influenced one of the most prominent political scientist of India, Dr.Devasya Verma. He is married to Kavita Zutshi.

Death 
Dehlvi died in his Noida home on 12 June 2020, from post COVID-19 complications.

See also

List of Urdu language poets
Urdu poetry

References

External links
 Rekhta Gulzar Video
 Rekhta Gulzar Couplets

People from Delhi
Urdu-language poets from India
Indian male poets
Ghazal
20th-century Indian poets
20th-century Indian male writers
1926 births
2020 deaths
Deaths from the COVID-19 pandemic in India